James Gordon Finlayson  (born 9 September 1964) is a British philosopher. He is reader in philosophy and director of the Centre for Social and Political Thought at the University of Sussex. Finlayson is a Fellow of the Royal Society of Arts and a former chair of the Society for European Philosophy (2007–2011).

Books
 Habermas: A Very Short Introduction, Oxford University Press, 2005 
 Habermas and Rawls: Disputing the Political, Fabian Freyenhagen and Gordon Finlayson, Routledge, 2010  
 The Habermas-Rawls Debate, Columbia University Press, 2019

References

External links
Gordon Finlayson at the University of Sussex
Personal website

21st-century British philosophers
Philosophy academics
Living people
Continental philosophers
Kant scholars
Academics of the University of Sussex
Political philosophers
Alumni of the University of St Andrews
Habermas scholars
Hegel scholars
1964 births